Amy Howden-Chapman (born 1984) is a New Zealand artist and writer based in the United States. Her works are held in the collection of the Auckland Art Gallery Toi o Tāmaki.

Early life 
Amy Howden-Chapman was born in 1984 in Wellington, New Zealand.

Education 
Howden-Chapman studied at Victoria University of Wellington and graduated with a master's degree in creative writing and an Honours degree in Art History. She later studied at the California Institute of the Arts, and graduated with a master's degree in Fine Arts.

Career 
Howden-Chapman has exhibited extensively in New Zealand, the United States and Europe. Using performance, photography, video and print, Howden-Chapman's work investigates moments of cultural, environmental and political change. Many of her works focus on climate change and environmental protection.

Howden-Chapman is co-founder (with Abby Cunnane) of TheDistancePlan.org, an organisation that seeks to promote climate change discussion within the arts.

Major commissions:

 The Flood, My Chanting, a work commissioned as part of One Day Sculpture 2008, a series of temporary public artworks around New Zealand.
 Meanwhile, a film work for Hue & Cry (2012).

Notable exhibitions:

 Since the Great Depression, as part of performance art duo Raised By Wolves (with Biddy Livesey), at the New Zealand Film Archive Theatre, Wellington, New Zealand (2009).
 They Say Ten Thousand Years at Te Uru Waitakere Contemporary Gallery, Auckland, New Zealand (2014).
 Advice for our Aerial Ocean at Artspace Mezzanine, Auckland, New Zealand (2014).
 Sad Problems at The Living Art Museum, Reykjavík, Iceland (2015).
 Brick Fall, Glass Wall, a moving image and sound installation at The Physics Room, Christchurch, New Zealand (2016).

Fellowships and awards 
 Residency in McCahon House in 2014, and presented an exhibition of works produced during that time titled They Say Ten Thousand Years, held at Te Uru Waitakere Contemporary Gallery. This exhibition was accompanied by an interpretive essay by Victoria Wynne-Jones titled Rainbow Warriors of Light.
 Recipient of the 2015 HOLA Public Art Residency, Los Angeles.
 2016 DAAD fellow at the Potsdam Institute for Climate Impact Research, Germany.

References 

1984 births
Living people
New Zealand women artists
People from Wellington City
Victoria University of Wellington alumni